NTCP8 may refer to:
 A SMS language abbreviation for "anticipate"
 NTCP8 also is a loci, an element of a gene (allele)